The TCA Award for Program of the Year is an award given by the Television Critics Association. It was first presented in 1985 with British television serial The Jewel in the Crown being the first recipient of the award. The category includes buth drama and comedy television series as well as limited series.

Only two programs have received the award more than once, HBO's The Sopranos in 1999 and 2001, and AMC's Breaking Bad in 2013 and 2014. HBO's Game of Thrones holds the record of most nominations in the category with seven followed by Homicide: Life on the Street, Lost and The Sopranos with five nominations each.

Winners and nominees

Multiple wins

2 wins
 Breaking Bad (consecutive)
 The Sopranos

Multiple nominees

7 nominations
 Game of Thrones

5 nominations
 Homicide: Life on the Street
 Lost
 The Sopranos

4 nominations
 The Americans
 Breaking Bad
 Mad Men

3 nominations
 24
 The Daily Show with Jon Stewart
 Friday Night Lights
 L.A. Law
 NYPD Blue
 St. Elsewhere
 The Simpsons
 The Wire

2 nominations
 American Idol
 Arrested Development
 Atlanta
 Better Call Saul
 Buffy the Vampire Slayer
 Cheers
 The Cosby Show
 ER
 Hacks
 The Handmaid's Tale
 Northern Exposure
 Seinfeld
 Succession
 The Shield
 This Is Us
 The West Wing
 The X-Files

Total awards by network

 HBO – 8
 CBS – 6
 NBC – 5
 ABC – 4
 Fox – 4
 AMC – 3
 PBS – 3
 FX – 2
 Amazon – 1
 Apple TV+ – 1
 Audience Network – 1
 Hulu – 1
 Syfy – 1

See also
Primetime Emmy Awards

References

External links
 Official website

Program